Ludwig Ivanovich Charlemagne, or Sharleman (Russian: Людвиг Иванович Шарлемань, 1784, Saint Petersburg — 16 November 1845, Saint Petersburg) was a Russian architect of French ancestry. He is sometimes referred to as Lodovik.

Biography 
His father, the sculptor Jean Baptiste Charlemagne-Baudet, came to Russia from Rouen in 1777, at the invitation of Catherine the Great. In 1797, together with his brothers Iosif, Ivan, and Karl, he entered the Imperial Academy of Fine Arts on a scholarship.

An iron gate at the Summer Garden was cast from his designs, in 1826. The following year, a tea house with Doric columns was added. On the Kamenny Islands, he built a guardhouse for the Kamenny Island Palace. He also constructed several dachas for the Imperial Family and the government.

Concurrently with those projects, he built an orphanage (completed 1834). Ten years later, it was converted into a new home for the Tsarskoye Selo Lyceum.

He died of dropsy, and was interred at Volkovo Cemetery.

References

Further reading 
 V. V. Antonov, Братья Шарлемани. Зодчие Санкт-Петербурга XIX — начала XX веков ("The Charlemagne Brothers", In: Architects of St. Petersburg of the XIX - early XX centuries, pgs. 219–224), Lenizdat, 1998

External links

 Biography from the Русский биографический словарь @ Russian Wikisource

1784 births
1845 deaths
Architects from the Russian Empire
Imperial Academy of Arts alumni
Architects from Saint Petersburg